Jack Donovan (born 1974) is an American masculist and writer.

Jack Donovan may also refer to:
 Jack Donovan (footballer) (1908–1964), Australian rules footballer
 Jack Donovan (actor) (1894–1981), American film actor

See also 
 John Donovan (disambiguation)